Mallobathra abyssina is a moth of the family Psychidae. This species is endemic to New Zealand.

Taxonomy
This species was first described by Charles Edwin Clarke in 1934 using a male specimen collected by himself at Franz Joseph Glacier in January and named Sabathinca abyssina. In 1988 J. S. Dugdale placed this species within the genus Mallobathra. George Hudson described the species in his 1939 publication A supplement to the butterflies and moths of New Zealand. The holotype specimen is held at Auckland Museum.

Description
Clarke described the adult of this species as follows:

Distribution

This species is endemic to New Zealand. The holotype specimen was collected on rocks on the north eastern side of Franz Josef Glacier.

References 

Moths described in 1934
Moths of New Zealand
Psychidae
Endemic fauna of New Zealand
Taxa named by Charles Edwin Clarke
Endemic moths of New Zealand